Tessa – Leben für die Liebe is another tite of the German television series Leben für die Liebe.

See also
List of German television series

External links
 

2006 German television series debuts
2006 German television series endings
German-language television shows
ZDF original programming